When annotating chess games, commentators frequently use widely recognized annotation symbols. Question marks and exclamation points that denote a move as bad or good are ubiquitous in chess literature. Some publications intended for an international audience, such as the Chess Informant, have a wide range of additional symbols that transcend language barriers.

The common symbols for evaluating the merits of a move are "??", "?", "?!", "!?", "!", and "!!". The chosen symbol is appended to the text describing the move (e.g. Re7? or Kh1!?); see Algebraic chess notation.

Use of these annotation symbols is subjective, as different annotators use the same symbols differently.

Evaluation symbols

Moves  
Move evaluation symbols, by increasing effectiveness of the move:

?? (Blunder)  

The double question mark "??" indicates a blunder, a very bad move that severely worsens the player's position. Typical moves that receive double question marks are those that overlook a tactic that wins substantial  or overlook a checkmate. A "??"-worthy move usually results in an immediately lost position. Occasionally, the sign is used for a move that transforms a won position into a draw. Though of course more common among amateurs, blunders occur at all levels of play.

? (Mistake)  
A single question mark "?" indicates that the annotator thinks that the move is a poor one and that it should not have been played. Mistakes often lead to loss of tempo, material, or otherwise a worsening of the player's position. The nature of a mistake may be more strategic than tactical; in some cases, the move receiving a question mark may be one for which it is difficult to find a refutation. A move that overlooks a forthcoming brilliant combination from the opponent would rarely receive more than one question mark, for example.

?! (Dubious move)  
This symbol is similar to the "!?" (below) but usually indicates that the annotator believes the move to be dubious or questionable but to possibly have merits. The "?!" may also indicate that the annotator believes the move is weak/deserving of criticism but not bad enough to warrant a "?". A sacrifice leading to a dangerous attack that the opponent should be able to defend against if they play well may receive a "?!". Alternatively, this may denote a move that is objectively bad but sets up an attractive trap.

!? (Interesting move)  
The "!?" is one of the more controversial symbols. Different books have slightly varying definitions. Among the definitions are "interesting, but perhaps not the best move", "move deserving attention", "enterprising move" and "risky move". Usually it indicates that the move leads to exciting or wild play but that the objective evaluation of the move is unclear. It is also often used when a player sets a cunning trap in a lost position. Typical moves receiving a "!?" are those involving speculative sacrifices or dangerous attacks that might turn out to be strategically deficient.

Andrew Soltis jokingly called "!?" the symbol of the lazy annotator who finds a move interesting but cannot be bothered to work out whether it is good or bad.

! (Good move)  
An exclamation point ("!") indicates a good move—especially one that is surprising or requires particular skill. 
The symbol may also be interpreted as "best move". Annotators are usually somewhat conservative with the use of this symbol.

Reasons for awarding the symbol vary widely between annotators; among them are strong , well-timed breakthroughs, sound sacrifices, moves that set traps in lost positions, moves that avoid such traps, and good psychological choices in the opening.

!! (Brilliant move)  
The double exclamation point ("!!") is used for very strong moves, usually difficult-to-find moves which require a high level of skill and calculation. Examples include sound sacrifices of large amounts of material and counter-intuitive moves that prove very powerful. For example, in what is known as the Game of the Century, annotators typically award a double exclamation point to 13-year-old Bobby Fischer's move 17...Be6, sacrificing the queen.

Others 
A few writers have used three or more exclamation points ("!!!") for exceptionally brilliant moves. For example, when annotating Rotlewi–Rubinstein 1907, Hans Kmoch awarded Rubinstein's 22...Rxc3 three exclamation points. Likewise, an exceptionally bad blunder may be awarded three or more question marks ("???"). The majority of chess writers and editors consider these symbols unnecessary.

A few writers have used unusual combinations of question marks and exclamation points (e.g. "!!?", "?!?", "??!") for particularly unusual, spectacular or controversial moves, but these have no generally accepted meaning and are typically used for humorous or entertainment purposes.

Sometimes annotation symbols are put in parentheses, e.g. "(?)", "(!)". Different writers have used these in different ways; for example, Ludek Pachman used "(?)" to indicate a move that he considered inferior but that he did not wish to comment on further; Simon Webb used it to indicate a move that is objectively sound, but was in his opinion a poor psychological choice; and Robert Hübner (see below) used it to indicate a move that is inaccurate and makes the player's task more difficult.

Alternative uses 
Some writers take a  less subjective or more formalized approach to these symbols.

Nunn's convention 
In his 1992 book Secrets of Rook Endings and other books in the series  (Secrets of Minor-Piece Endings and Secrets of Pawnless Endings), John Nunn uses these symbols in a more specific way in the context of endgames where the optimal line of play can be determined with certainty:

This convention has been used in some later works, such as Fundamental Chess Endings and Secrets of Pawn Endings by Karsten Müller and Frank Lamprecht, but it can be safely assumed the convention is not being used unless there is a specific note otherwise. The Nunn convention cannot be used to annotate full games because the exact evaluation of a position is generally impractical to compute.

In 1959, Euwe and Hooper made the same use of the question mark, "... a decisive error ...".

Hübner's approach 
German grandmaster Robert Hübner prefers an even more specific and restrained use of move evaluation symbols:

Chess composition 
When the solution to a certain chess problem is given, there are also some conventions that have become a common practice:

Positions  
These symbols indicate the strategic balance of the game position:

Other symbols  
There are other symbols used by various chess engines and publications, such as Chess Informant and Encyclopaedia of Chess Openings, when annotating moves or describing positions. Many of the symbols now have Unicode encodings, but quite a few still require a special chess font with appropriated characters.

Move-related

Positions or conditions

See also 
 Algebraic notation (chess)
 Chess notation
 Numeric Annotation Glyphs
 Chess symbols in Unicode

Notes

References 

Bibliography

Chess notation
Lists of symbols